Scott Barry Guyett (born 20 January 1976) is a professional football defender. He has been on the books of the Brisbane City Soccer Club in Newmarket, Queensland.

Career
Guyett was born in Ascot, Berkshire, England. He is of Australian nationality, having spent most of his childhood in Australia. His career in England started at Gresley Rovers, where he won a Southern League title in 1996–97 before making an impact with Southport, who were enjoying a period of relative success in the Football Conference. He helped them to a top-four finish in 2000–01 and then followed manager Mark Wright to Football League side Oxford United along with central defensive partner Phil Bolland.

A year later, Guyett was on the move again as he teamed up with Wright at Chester City, where he was named player of the season in 2002–03 and then won a Conference championship medal a year later. But he opted to join Yeovil Town in the summer of 2004 and remained there until 2008, bar a loan spell with Aldershot Town in 2005. In May 2007, Guyett played at Wembley Stadium in the Football League One play-off final against Blackpool (making him the first Australian to play at the new Wembley).

He moved to AFC Bournemouth in the summer of 2008, at the age of 32, after being allowed to leave Yeovil Town by mutual consent. He was released two years later, and after a short spell with Dorchester Town, moved to Crystal Palace to work as the club's Fitness Coach.

Honours
Yeovil Town
Football League Two: 2004–05

Chester City
Football Conference: 2003–04

Gresley Rovers
Southern League: 1996–97

Individual
 Chester City Player of the season: 2002–03
 Football Conference Team of the Year: 2002–03

References

External links
Profile on Official Site

1976 births
Living people
People from Ascot, Berkshire
Association football defenders
English footballers
Australian soccer players
Australian expatriate soccer players
England semi-pro international footballers
English Football League players
National League (English football) players
Aldershot Town F.C. players
AFC Bournemouth players
Chester City F.C. players
Gresley F.C. players
Oxford United F.C. players
Southport F.C. players
Yeovil Town F.C. players
Dorchester Town F.C. players
Crystal Palace F.C. non-playing staff